Jessica Pickering (born 24 April 2001) is an Australian trampoline gymnast.

Biography
Pickering started trampoline gymnastics when he was seven years old. Her mother feared for her on the trampoline at home and persuaded her to join Eastlake Trampoline Sports Club. She is still with the same club. 

She participated at the 2018 Summer Youth Olympics, where she won a silver medal, 2019 FIG World Cup, and 2021 FIG World Cup.

Pickering represented Australia at the Tokyo 2020 Olympic Games, in Women's trampoline. She was ranked sixteenth and last in the qualification round after making errors in both routines.

References 

2001 births
Living people
Gymnasts at the 2020 Summer Olympics
Australian female trampolinists
Olympic gymnasts of Australia
Sportswomen from New South Wales
Gymnasts at the 2018 Summer Youth Olympics